Bradford City A.F.C. is an English professional association football club based in Bradford, West Yorkshire. Bradford City been a member of the Football League since its formation in 1903. The following contains two lists; a list of all current players who have made at least one appearance in the Football League, and a list of former players who have made 50 or more appearances in the Football League for Bradford City.

Current players

Former players
The following is a list of Bradford City players who have made 50 or more appearances in the Football League for Bradford City.

Notes

Sources
 
 Soccerbase
 

 
Bradford City A.F.C. players
Players
Association football player non-biographical articles